Suastus gremius, the Indian palm bob or palm bob, is a butterfly belonging to the family Hesperiidae. It is found in the  Indomalayan realm.

Description

Subspecies
S. g. gremius South India, Northwest Himalayas to Burma, Thailand, Laos, Vietnam, Hainan, Hong Kong, Formosa, Langkawi, Malaya
S. g. chilon  Doherty, 1891   Sumba
S. g. subgrisea  (Moore, 1878)  Sri Lanka

Biology
The larva feeds on species of  Phoenix , Rhapis, Caryota and Washingtonia

References

Hesperiinae
Butterflies of Asia
Butterflies of Singapore
Butterflies of Indochina